The 9th Greek Regiment was a regiment that was part of the 3rd Infantry Brigade of the 1st Zadneprovskaya Ukrainian Soviet Division, formed on the basis of the Greek detachments of the Revolutionary Insurgent Army of Ukraine in February 1919.

History
In 1918, to fight the rule of Pavlo Skoropadskyi in the Mariupol district of the Yekaterinoslav province, the local Greeks – the Rumeíka and the Urums – formed several rebel groups.

In February 1919, the headquarters of the Revolutionary Insurgent Army of Ukraine united most of the Greek detachments. There were up to one and a half thousand rebels in the new formation. On February 21, 1919, the commander of the 2nd Ukrainian Soviet Army, issued an order to form the 1st Zadneprovsk Division. The third brigade of the division consisted of Makhnovist detachments, the Greek regiment under the command of Takhtamyshev became known as the 9th Regiment of the 3rd Brigade. On March 19, the regiment took part in the battle of Mariupol against the White Army, after which Dybenko awarded the 9th regiment with the honorary Red Banner.

At the end of June 1919, the 9th regiment occupied a part of the front stretching from Berdyansk to the village of Pokrovskoye. Under Takhtamyshev's command were 2,000 Red Army soldiers, of which 1,200 were without rifles. At the end of 1919, Takhtamyshev's unarmed detachment joined the 14th Army.

References

Bibliography

External links
The Greek Makhnovists - Nick Heath

Paramilitary forces of Ukraine
Defunct anarchist militant groups
Revolutionary Insurgent Army of Ukraine
Militarized anarchist formations
Military history of Ukraine
Military units and formations established in 1918
Soviet units and formations of the Russian Civil War
Military units and formations disestablished in 1919
Regiments of Ukraine
Russian Revolution in Ukraine
History of Dnipro